The 2016 European Athletics Youth Championships was the first edition of the biennial, continental athletics competition for European athletes aged fifteen to seventeen. It was held in Tbilisi, Georgia from 14–17 July and was established following the 2013 Congress of the EAA in Skopje. The event programme mirrored that of the previous IAAF World Youth Championships in Athletics, with the exception of a boy's decathlon, rather than the octathlon. Around 900 athletes from 46 European Athletics Member Federations took part.

This was the only edition of the championships to be described as "Youth Championships". World and European Athletics hereafter changed their nomenclature from "Youth" and "Junior" to "Under-18" and "Under-20" respectively.

Medal summary

Men

Women

Medal table

Participating nations

References

External links
 Official web site
 Results

European Athletics U18 Championships
European Youth Athletics Championships
2016 in European sport
2016 in Georgian sport
International sports competitions hosted by Georgia (country)
Sports competitions in Tbilisi
Athletics in Georgia (country)
European Athletics Youth Championships
2016 in youth sport